Shogomoc River Pedestrian Bridge is a 265-foot suspension bridge in Canterbury, New Brunswick. It officially opened in October 2011. It is part of the Trans Canada Trail and the Sentier NB Trail network. Sentier NB Trail provided $305,000 toward the project. It is known as the final non-motorized trail link between the town of Grand Bay–Westfield and the border of the province of Quebec.

Valerie Pringle was present as a Trans Canada Trail representative during the ribbon cutting ceremony.

References 

http://www.sentiernbtrail.com/index.php?option=com_sobi2&sobi2Task=sobi2Details&catid=0&sobi2Id=9&Itemid=&lang=en
https://archive.today/20131218122640/http://nben.ca/en/my-nb-eco-community/events/viewevent/242-shogomoc-bridge-grand-opening
http://www.sentiernbtrail.com/index.php?option=com_content&view=article&id=58%3Ashogomoc-bridge-grand-opening&catid=1%3Anews&Itemid=1&lang=en
http://www.cj104.com/News/story.aspx?ID=1562609
http://www.cj104.com/news/Story.aspx?ID=1536551
http://www.cj104.com/news/Story.aspx?ID=1427693
http://www.k93.ca/Channels/Story.aspx?ID=1297964
http://www.theglobeandmail.com/partners/advtct/key-accomplishments-of-2011/article4364077/

Suspension bridges in Canada
Pedestrian bridges in Canada
Bridges in New Brunswick